Phyllostegia mollis, the Waianae Range phyllostegia, is a species of flowering plant in the mint family, Lamiaceae, that is endemic to Hawaii. Some authors consider it to be an Oahu endemic, with the Maui populations belonging to a separate species, Phyllostegia pilosa. By 2003 there were fewer than 40 individuals remaining. It is threatened by habitat loss.

References

mollis
Endemic flora of Hawaii
Waianae Range
Taxa named by George Bentham
Taxonomy articles created by Polbot